Ctenotus aphrodite, also known commonly as the Oorida ctenotus, is a species of skink, a lizard in the family Scincidae. The species is endemic to Australia.

Etymology
The specific name, aphrodite, refers to Aphrodite, the goddess of love and beauty in Greek mythology.

Geographic range
C. aphrodite is found in southwestern Queensland, Australia.

Reproduction
C. aphrodite is oviparous.

Taxonomy
C. aphrodite may be a synonym of C. septenarius.

References

Further reading
Cogger HG (2014). Reptiles and Amphibians of Australia, Seventh Edition. Clayton, Victoria, Australia: CSIRO Publishing. xxx + 1,033 pp. .
Ingraham GJ, Czechura GV (1990). "Four new species of striped skinks from Queensland". Memoirs of the Queensland Museum 29 (3): 407–410. (Ctenotus aphrodite, new species).
Wilson S, Swan G (2013). A Complete Guide to Reptiles of Australia, Fourth Edition. Sydney: New Holland Publishers. 522 pp. .

aphrodite
Reptiles described in 1990
Taxa named by Glen Joseph Ingram
Taxa named by Greg V. Czechura